"Battle of Intramuros" can also refer to the several Battles fought over Manila.
The Battle of Intramuros is the rivalry between Colegio de San Juan de Letran Knights and Mapúa Institute of Technology Cardinals; both are walking distance from each other at Manila's Intramuros district. The rivalry is played at the National Collegiate Athletic Association (Philippines).

The rivalry is notable in which even though Letran performs better in league competition, they have never swept the elimination round meetings against their neighbors in recent years.

The Battle of Intramuros may also refer to the "original" rivalry between University of the Philippines Manila (UP) and Ateneo de Manila in which first began on 1915 when UP and Ateneo played basketball games on Intramuros. Eventually the rivalry died down and was revived when both schools competed in the University Athletic Association of the Philippines and is now called the "Battle of Katipunan" from the avenue that connects Ateneo's new campus at Quezon City and University of the Philippines Diliman (The Manila university stopped sponsoring collegiate athletics after World War II.)

Another "Battle of Intramuros", though not as prominent as the one between Letran and Mapúa, was formed when Lyceum of the Philippines University, another Intramuros-based institution sandwiched between Letran's and Mapúa's campuses, joined the NCAA as a guest team in 2011 and was advertised as such whenever the Pirates play either the Knights or the Cardinals. However, due to Lyceum's status as a guest team, it is not considered a rivalry for now.

Men's basketball results
Both teams are guaranteed to face each other at the elimination round (regular season) twice, while they can meet for a maximum of three times in the playoffs. Mapua leads the eliminations 26-22 over Letran.

Elimination round

Playoffs

Juniors basketball results 
Juniors games between Letran and Mapua have not been played under this label. While Letran's high school has always been at Intramuros, Mapua's high schools have always been outside its walls, staying at the Santa Cruz district for most of its history, then the current Malayan High School of Science now being found at Paco.

See also
Letran - San Beda rivalry
San Sebastian–Letran rivalry

References
NCAA historical results

National Collegiate Athletic Association (Philippines) rivalries
Colegio de San Juan de Letran
Mapúa University